Bùi (Chữ Hán: 裴)  is a common Vietnamese surname, ranked 9th among the most common surnames in Vietnam. The surname Pei (裴) in Chinese and Bae (배) in Korean share the same origin with it.

Bui is also an Italian surname.

Bùi may refer to:

 Bùi Bích Phương, Miss Vietnam in 1988
 Bùi Diễm, Ambassador
 Bùi Đình Đạm, a general of the Army of the Republic of Vietnam (ARVN).
 Bùi Đình Dĩnh, Ambassador
 Bùi Thanh Liêm, astronaut
 Bùi Thế Sơn, Vietnamese-American singer
 Bùi Thị Xuân, Vietnamese general
 Bui Tuong Phong, computer graphics researcher and pioneer
 Bùi Thị Nhung, high jumper
 Bùi Tín, dissident
 Bùi Thị Xuân, general
 Bùi Tấn Trường, goalkeeper
 Bui Xuan Phai, painter

Vietnamese-language surnames
Surnames of Vietnamese origin